Rebecca Bedford (born 26 May 1998) is an English para badminton player who competes in international level events and powerlifter who competes in national level events. She participates in women's doubles badminton events with Rachel Choong.

Achievements

World Championships 

Women's singles

Women's doubles

Mixed doubles

European Championships 
Women's singles

Women's doubles

Mixed doubles

References

1998 births
Living people
People from Yoxall
Sportspeople from Lichfield
Paralympic powerlifters of Great Britain
English female badminton players
British para-badminton players
Powerlifters at the 2022 Commonwealth Games
Commonwealth Games competitors for England

Notes